Triviella millardi is a species of small sea snail, a marine gastropod mollusc in the family Triviidae, the trivias.

Distribution
This snail is known around the South African coast from Port Nolloth to the Cape Peninsula in 10–30 m. It is endemic to that area.

Description
Triviella millardi has a plump round white shell, which is usually completely covered with the yellowish mantle, which is variably streaked with white or may have dark spots. It reaches a maximum size of 40 mm.

Ecology
The white-streaked form of this animal resembles the scribbled nudibranch, Doriopsilla miniata, which may cause fish predators to avoid it.

References

Triviidae
Gastropods described in 1979